Marines is a commune in the Val-d'Oise department in Île-de-France in northern France.

Twinning
Marines has been twinned with the town of Kington in England since 1979. The two places are of a similar population. In Marines there is a residential side-street called "Place Kington", whilst in Kington there is a covered space by the market hall called "Place-de-Marines".

Education
Schools in Marines:
Ecole maternelle des Murgers (preschool)
Ecole élémentaire Paul Cézanne
Collège des Hautiers (junior high school)

Trivia

Marines is located next to a village called Us. In the surrounding area, both villages are indicated with signs showing both names listed, which reads as "US MARINES". A regular joke in the region is to make people believe that these signs indicate a nearby U.S Marine Corps base.

See also
Communes of the Val-d'Oise department

References

External links

Official website 

Land use (IAURIF) 
Association of Mayors of the Val d'Oise 

Communes of Val-d'Oise